Ermin Alić (born 23 February 1992) is a Montenegrin football defender who plays for OFK Titograd.

Club career
Born in Bijelo Polje, Alić started his career in local club Jedinstvo, but later moved in Rudar Pljevlja, where he collected 50 First League appearances and scored one goal in two seasons. In summer 2013 he signed with Villarreal B, where he spent next two seasons. He made a three-year deal with Spartak Subotica in summer 2015, but he released after first half of 2015–16 season, after only one official appearance for Spartak. In the winter break off-season 2015–16, Alić returned to Rudar Pljevlja.

International career
Alić was a member of the under-19 national selection, and used to be a captain of the under-21 squad.

In May 2016 he was part of Montenegro "B" team.

Career statistics

Notes

References

External links
 
 
 

1992 births
Living people
People from Bijelo Polje
Association football central defenders
Montenegrin footballers
Montenegro youth international footballers
Montenegro under-21 international footballers
FK Jedinstvo Bijelo Polje players
FK Rudar Pljevlja players
Villarreal CF B players
FK Spartak Subotica players
FK Dečić players
NK Triglav Kranj players
NK Olimpija Ljubljana (2005) players
OFK Titograd players
Montenegrin First League players
Segunda División B players
Serbian SuperLiga players
Slovenian PrvaLiga players
Montenegrin expatriate footballers
Expatriate footballers in Spain
Montenegrin expatriate sportspeople in Spain
Expatriate footballers in Serbia
Montenegrin expatriate sportspeople in Serbia
Expatriate footballers in Slovenia
Montenegrin expatriate sportspeople in Slovenia
Montenegrin Second League players